VCA Animal Hospitals, incorporated as VCA, Inc., operates more than 1,000 animal hospitals in the US and Canada. The company is based in Los Angeles, and was founded in 1986. Until its acquisition by Mars in 2017, VCA traded on the NASDAQ under the ticker "WOOF".

VCA was founded in 1986 by three health care company executives, Neil Tauber and brothers Robert (Bob) and Arthur (Art) Antin. The name is an abbreviation of "Veterinary Centers of America." VCA acquired its first veterinary clinic, West Los Angeles Veterinary Hospital, in 1987.

In October 2004, VCA purchased Sound Technologies, a company which supplied digital radiology and ultrasound equipment to veterinary hospitals. In July 2009, VCA purchased diagnostic imaging company Eklin Medical Systems, which was combined with Sound Technologies to form Sound/Antech Imaging Services.

In 2014, VCA acquired the dog day care center Camp Bow Wow, which had about 140 franchises in the US and one in Canada and licensed The Barkley Pet Hotel & Day Spa brand in Westlake Village, California from Beverly Hills Pet Hotels, Inc. 

On January 9, 2017, Mars Inc. announced its intention to purchase VCA for $9.1 billion, operating it as an independent unit within Mars Petcare. VCA CEO Bob Antin remained in his position.

References

External links

Corporate website

Companies based in Los Angeles
Companies formerly listed on the Nasdaq
American companies established in 1986
1986 establishments in California
Veterinary medicine companies
Mars, Incorporated
2017 mergers and acquisitions
Veterinary medicine in the United States